An Enemy Of Men is a 1925 American silent melodrama film directed by Frank R. Strayer from an original script by Douglas Bronston. It stars Dorothy Revier, Cullen Landis, and Caesare Gravina, and was released by Columbia Pictures on July 1, 1925.

Plot
As described in a film magazine review, because of her sister's betrayal and subsequent death, Norma Bennett takes a vow to make all men pay. She becomes a night club favorite and is courted by John Hurd, who is the man who ruined her sister. Dr. Phil Ordway is in love with her, but she refuses his offer of marriage. When she discovers the identity of John as her sister's betrayer, she takes a gun and goes to the cabaret to shoot him, but he dies by another's hand. She then agrees and weds Dr. Ordway.

Cast list
 Dorothy Revier as Norma Bennett
 Cullen Landis as Dr. Phil Ordway
 Caesare Gravina as Tony Caruso
 Charles Clary as John Hurd
 Leo White as Roberti
 Barbara Luddy as Janet
 Virginia Marshall as Baby Janet
 Margaret Landis as Miss Ordway

References

Bibliography
 Munden, Kenneth White. The American Film Institute Catalog of Motion Pictures Produced in the United States, Part 1. University of California Press, 1997.

External links
 
 
 

Columbia Pictures films
Films directed by Frank R. Strayer
Melodrama films
1925 drama films
1925 films
Silent American drama films
American silent feature films
American black-and-white films
1920s English-language films
1920s American films